MindGeek (formerly Manwin) is a Luxembourg-based, privately held company with Canada as its center of operations that primarily focuses on pornography. It operates many popular streaming websites, as well as film production companies Digital Playground, Men.com, Reality Kings, Sean Cody, and WhyNotBi.com, among others. MindGeek is headquartered in Luxembourg, and maintains additional offices in Bucharest, Dublin, London, Los Angeles, and Montreal. A spokesperson for the company stated that they are "one of the top five bandwidth consumption companies in the world".

MindGeek has been subject to a number of lawsuits and filed litigation against its competitors. They were sued in California for hosting non-consensual pornography produced by GirlsDoPorn, which coerced women into appearing in their videos under false pretenses. In January 2021, a class action lawsuit making similar claims was launched in Montreal for anyone who had pornography photos and videos, some of which may have been taken when they were underage, shared on MindGeek's sites without their consent, since 2007. The lawsuit stated that MindGeek knowingly did not "investigate or question its business partner regarding the mounting evidence of sex trafficking". In February 2021, a U.S.-based civil class action lawsuit was launched against MindGeek on behalf of child sex trafficking victims whose child sexual abuse material was uploaded to Pornhub. Many journalistic outlets accuse the company of having a monopoly over the online pornography industry, with 3 out of the 10 most popular online pornography sites owned by MindGeek.

History

Origin and merger
In the late 1990s, German-born Fabian Thylmann created NATS (Next-Generation Affiliate Tracking Software), which was used for marketing pornography across different websites. Mansef was funded by Concordia University graduates Stephane Manos and Ouissam Youssef (Mansef a portmanteau of the two's surnames) in 2004 as the holding company for various "thumbnail gallery post" websites and an affiliate network. It later launched Brazzers and a porn production company among various other pay sites.

In 2006, Thylmann sold his shares in the company that controlled NATS and used the proceeds to purchase the Privat Amateure website. Matt Keezer started PornHub in 2007 under Interhub in which Mansef was also a partner. Mansef was run as a familial business with several of the company managers being related to each other; Manos, Youssef and Keezer later wanted to sell the companies, looking to move onto other ventures. Between 2006 and 2010, Thylmann bought three more websites: MyDirtyHobby, Webcams, and Xtube. The domain name manwin.com was first registered in August 2007.

In March 2010, Thylmann bought the assets of Mansef and Interhub, and merged the properties into a new entity called Manwin. Thylmann also bought WebCams.com in a separate deal during the same period.

Website acquisitions
Manwin went on an acquisition spree of other popular pornographic entities. In June 2010, Manwin opened non-adult video sharing website Videobash.com (now defunct). In September 2010, Manwin acquired EuroRevenue, which owned various niche pornography sites. In November 2010, Manwin introduced celebrity news website Celebs.com (now defunct). In December 2010, Manwin entered into a partnership with Wicked Pictures to manage Wicked Pictures' paysites. The 2010 Manwin purchases accounted for US$130 million in debt. In 2011, the company raised US$362 million in financing from 125 secret investors, including Fortress Investment Group, JPMorgan Chase, and Cornell University.

In May 2011, Manwin acquired the pornographic video sharing website YouPorn. In June 2011, Manwin bought all adult related assets of Carsed Marketing Incorporated, including Twistys, Twistys Cash Affiliate Program, GayTube, SexTube, and TrannyTube. Manwin also created 3DXSTAR in a partnership with Funky Monkey Productions. In November 2011, Manwin became an operating partner of Playboy, managing the brand's online and entertainment business Playboy Plus Entertainment, which operates a number of television channels and online services based in the UK and Benelux. Manwin also launched Legendary Stats, a service that aggregates multiple affiliate programs and is targeted at affiliate site operators with large traffic volumes.

In January 2012, Manwin signed a deal to acquire the assets of the American pornographic movie studio Digital Playground. In April 2012, Manwin and Miami-based RK Netmedia Inc. filed a merger notification jointly authorized by Manwin and Reality Kings with the Austrian Federal Competition Authority. In September 2012, Manwin completed the acquisition. Company documents show that following the deal in the autumn, RK Holdings gave a Dublin company, Manwin Content RK, the right to use thousands of its pornography movies. In June 2012, Manwin launched Babes.com for its "glamcore" network.

In March 2013, Mindgeek's co-owner Feras Antoon and his brother Mark Antoon were cited alongside the CEO of gaming technology giant Amaya Inc. and various of its own senior officers and stakeholders. The Quebec Market Authority, the province's market regulator that is somewhat equivalent to the U.S. SEC, investigated Amaya's executives for trading on privileged information. According to the charges, some Mindgeek executives were found to have benefited from the leak of information, although they were not major players in the insider trading ring.

In July 2013, Manwin filed a merger notification with the Austrian Competition Authority to acquire RedTube.com. During the summer of 2013, Manwin / Mindgeek acquired all of RedTube properties from Hong Kong-based Bright Imperial Ltd. for an undisclosed sum. In December 2013, the domain name RedTube8.xxx was also transferred to MindGeek after a trademark dispute.

Rebranding as MindGeek
In October 2013, Thylmann sold his stake in Manwin after coming under tax evasion charges to the senior management of the company, composed of Feras Antoon and David Tassilo, for $100 million, and later in the same month the company's name was changed to Mindgeek. This took place as Manwin and Redtube, a very large porn tube site not in its network, merged.

Playboy CEO Scott Flanders described the 2011 partnership with MindGeek as "the biggest mistake I've made at the company," saying that "Playboy should not have association with being in the sex-act business." In the spring of 2014, Playboy took back control of Playboy.com "at significant expense", although Mindgeek still retained control of Playboy TV and Playboy Plus, and Mindgeek still owns the Spice TV channels, which were also bought from Playboy.

In December 2014, MindGeek announced they had signed a deal to manage the online assets of Really Useful Ltd., some of which include the websites BDSM.xxx, Casting.xxx, Czech.xxx, DaneJones.com, FakeAgent.com, FakeTaxi.com, Lesbea.com, MassageRooms.com, Mature.xxx, Mom.xxx, Orgasms.xxx, PublicAgent.com, PublicSex.xxx, Teen.xxx, and Tubes.xxx.

In April 2015, Playboy Plus and M7 Group formed a partnership to launch Reality Kings TV in Benelux and Central and Eastern Europe on satellite TV services. In May 2015, MindGeek signed a distribution deal with Pulse Distribution, one of the largest distributors of adult entertainment, to distribute content from MindGeek's movie studios, including content from Brazzers and Digital Playground, and DVDs from Babes.com, Men.com, Mofos and Reality Kings. In October 2015, MindGeek acquired ExtremeTube, SpankWire, KeezMovies,. These sites are interlinked in network called Spankwire Sites in similar fashion as the PornHub Network.

In April 2018, MindGeek started accepting Verge cryptocurrency as payment for their various services.

In December 2020, a Financial Times exposé was published, listing Bernard Bergemar as the main owner of MindGeek.

In June 2022, the company confirmed the resignation of its CEO, Feras Antoon, and its COO, David Tassillo.

On March 16, 2023 Mindgeek was acquired by Ethical Capital Partners, an Ottawa private equity firm. This acquisition came a day after Netflix debuted the documentary, Money Shot, which looks at the controversies involving Pornhub.

Corporate structure 
MindGeek operates under a complex structure of multiple companies in countries such as the British Virgin Islands, Canada, Curaçao, Cyprus, Germany, Ireland, Luxembourg, Mauritius, the Netherlands, the United Kingdom, and the United States. Its structure has been described as mostly a way to avoid corporate tax by a de facto Canadian company; with billing companies in Ireland, subsidiaries in Curaçao and holding ones in Cyprus and Luxembourg, all countries that have been identified as tax havens or having lax tax regulations. Canada also has special tax treaties with Luxembourg, the legal headquarters of MindGeek, where a Canadian subsidiary is exempt from taxes paid on royalties to its Luxembourg parent.

Most employees work at the headquarters in Montreal on Décarie Boulevard, opposite the Orange Julep, where more than 1,000 are employed.

Adult industry
In 2013, the adult industry news website XBIZ described MindGeek as "the largest adult entertainment operator globally", and a spokesperson from Manwin, who spoke to the Irish Independent newspaper in 2013, stated that they are "one of the top five bandwidth consumption companies in the world". The Internet pornography review site TheBestPorn.com lists 164 pornographic membership sites that are owned or represented by MindGeek.

It has been reported that MindGeek's dominance in online pornography may have negative results because of the monopolistic powers they have from owning both production and distribution avenues.

Pornhub Network
The "Pornhub Network" is a network of web 2.0 websites accessible through Mindgeek's PornMD search engine. Mindgeek owns and operates all of the websites in the Pornhub Network, which includes GayTube, Peeperz, PornIQ (launched by Pornhub), PornMD, Pornhub RedTube Thumbzilla, Tube8, and YouPorn.

The three highest ranking sites in the Pornhub Network are Pornhub, RedTube and YouPorn. In November 2013, it was reported that Pornhub has over 1 billion visitors per month, and a December 2014 article in Adweek states that Pornhub has 50 million daily visitors. Pornhub.com scores at Alexa Global Rank 27 (as of 18 March 2019). Pornhub has been criticized for hosting non-consensual pornography, with some victims reporting that Pornhub failed to act or acted slowly or ineffectively when pointed to the videos of them. They were also criticized for their partnership with GirlsDoPorn and failure to remove their videos from the website after sex trafficking charges against the company were filed. After significant backlash, on December 14, 2020, Pornhub removed all non-verified videos on their platform.

TrafficEstimate.com said that Redtube.com generates over 90 million visits per month, while YouPorn.com had almost 80 million visits per month (based on the data for 30 days up to mid November 2014. Data for Pornhub.com was not available from TrafficEstimate). YouPorn claim that their partner program has 400 content providers who participate.

Babes.com

The hardcore pornographic website Babes.com was launched by Manwin in 2012. The website was described as "glamcore" because it  includes elements of glamour photography and erotic photography.  Full-length videos are accessible to registered members.  there were four websites operating under Babes.com, which featured different settings and sexual preferences. Babes.com is indexed by models as well as scenes and categories. , the Babes website had a global traffic ranking of 11,394. The website ranks as the third most-accessed site of MindGeek's network of porn sites.

Pornography for mobile devices
MindGeek's mobile pornography websites handle millions of visits each day in North America; they were awarded the "Future Mobile Award for Mobile Adult Services" by Juniper Research in 2012.

Pornographic movie studios
MindGeek owns the pornographic movie studios Babes.com, Brazzers, Digital Playground, Reality Kings, Sean Cody, Twistys, Mofos.com and Men.com, they manage the websites of Wicked Pictures, and Really Useful Ltd., and they established 3DXSTAR in partnership with Funky Monkey Productions. Mindgeek also manage Playboys online and television operations (although they no longer manage Playboy.com, see history section above). In January 2014, a Mindgeek official stated that they were developing an Android app for Google's Chromecast digital media player, along with an app for Panasonic smart TVs, that would enable streaming of Playboy.tv content. The plan to release a Chromecast app was shown to be unfeasible in February 2014, when Google originally revealed their terms of service for Chromecast app developers, which stated that "We don't allow content that contains nudity, graphic sex acts, or sexually explicit material."

Reality pornography
MindGeek owns the reality pornography (commercial pornography that emulates amateur pornography) video websites Mofos, MyDirtyHobby, Sextube, and Webcams.

No on Government Waste Committee
Manwin was the biggest funder of the No on Government Waste Committee, which was supported by a coalition of entertainment companies, local business organizations, community activists, adult entertainment performers and healthcare advocates." The committee ran the No on Measure B campaign, against a proposed law to require the use of condoms in all vaginal and anal sex scenes in pornography productions filmed in Los Angeles County, California. The No on Measure B campaign was supported by the Los Angeles County Federation of Republican Women, the Los Angeles County Republican and Libertarian Parties, the Valley Industry & Commerce Association (VICA), and the Log Cabin Republicans of Los Angeles.

PornMD

PornMD is a search engine for the Pornhub Network, which is the group of Web 2.0 pornographic video sharing websites owned by MindGeek. The sites are supported by advertising, which allows users unrestricted access free of charge. The Pornhub network links these websites to each other. PornMD does not host any videos itself, and the search results are created on the website with direct links to the video hosting website.

In March 2013 PornMD launched an interactive map which allows users to view the top 10 searches on PornMD for any selected country, and in February 2014 they introduced a live feed which shows search terms inputted by users in real time.

Advertising
MindGeek host advertisements on their sites using their TrafficJunky ad network and other sites, which receives billions of ad impressions on a daily basis.

Pornhub (which is owned by MindGeek) has conducted several of its own advertising campaigns, including a billboard in Times Square, product placement in the film Don Jon, and a tree planting campaign. The vice president of Pornhub, Corey Price commented in December 2014 that Pornhub wants to make watching porn "something that's acceptable to talk about", which would be likely to benefit Pornhub, since according to Price "it's still taboo [to advertise on X-rated sites like Pornhub]". In October 2013, the media and marketing publication Digiday reported that Pornhub has already shown advertisements for various mainstream products on the Pornhub web site, including advertisements for movies, musical acts, anti-virus software, and a food delivery service, although most advertisements were still adult-related.

In mid-March 2023, media outlets reported an ad-campaign on Pornhub by Russian mercenary company 'Wagner Group' for new recruits. According to Newsweek, this ad was later removed by Pornhub due to its "politically related" nature.

Malvertising
It was reported in April 2013 that visitors to some of the world's most popular (by Alexa rank) pornography sites risked malware being installed on their machines by malicious third party advertisements. The claims were made by security researcher Conrad Longmore, who writes a blog on malware, spam and scams. Longmore's figures were collected using Google Safe Browsing Diagnostics, which looks for harmful content on websites, and the statistics for two sites; xHamster and Pornhub were published by BBC News. The BBC article stated that based on Longmore's research, 5% of pages on xHamster (which has never been owned by Mindgeek / Manwin), and 12.7% of pages on Pornhub incorporated malvertising. MindGeek (still known as Manwin at the time) said in a statement that their own figures showed that 0.003% of the advertisements they served over the period that Longmore's data was collected contained malware, and they said that the advertisements they serve are monitored for malware and malware is immediately removed.

In July 2013, Manwin announced that they had come to an agreement with the online security provider RiskIQ to scan third party advertisements hosted on their TrafficJunky ad network for malware before they go live, and to continue to monitor ads for malware once they are live.

Payment bans
In August 2022, Mastercard and Visa banned the use of their services for Mindgeek's subsidiaries.

Selected current properties 
(According to TheBestPorn.com.)

 Pornhub
 PornMD
 RedTube
 YouPorn
 Reality Kings
 Digital Playground
 Men.com
 Sean Cody
 Brazzers
 Twistys
 WhyNotBi.com
 Mofos Network
 Babes Network
 MILF Hunter
 Milf Next Door
 Euro Sex Parties
 Crazy College GFs
 Wicked.com
 Adult.com
 See My Wife

Age controls and child protection

ASACP
Mindgeek has been a Platinum Sponsor of ASACP (Association of Sites Advocating Child Protection) since 2011. ASACP is an American non-profit organization that fights against child pornography and aims to enhance the effectiveness of parental content filtering technology through the provision of the RTA ("Restricted to Adults") label, which can be implemented by webmasters of adult sites.

Age verification in the UK
In March 2014 the UK video-on-demand co-regulator ATVOD requested a change in the law so that credit and debit card operators would be forbidden from processing payments from British customers of pornographic websites that did not carry out age checks before granting access. MindGeek responded in a statement: "The best solution lies in a multi-layered approach in which the parent assumes the central role." The UK's Conservative Party won the country's 2015 general election with a pledge to obligate UK internet service providers to block access to hardcore pornographic websites that did not implement age restrictions by using verifiable age checks. In light of this Mindgeek joined talks in May 2015 with the Digital Policy Alliance (DPA), an organisation that is funded by digital technology companies and informs members of parliament in the UK and the EU on policy issues that affect online and digital technologies. The DPA has a working group to create age verification methods that could be used to comply with such laws.

The Digital Economy Act 2017 introduced the relevant legislation, and in March 2018 MindGeek announced that its AgeID age-verification tool, which has been in use in Germany since 2015, would be made available in the UK in time for the proposed introduction of compulsory age-verification in April 2018. It was intended that the software would be made commercially available to all pornographic websites accessible within the UK, and offered free to independent UK studios, producers and bloggers. The software uses "third-party age-verification companies" to authenticate the age of those who register, after which they are able to access multiple sites across multiple devices without logging in again. Mindgeek was one of the leading private companies competing to provide an age-verification solution for the British Board of Film Classification, the organisation designated as responsible for the age-verification process. The implementation date was originally April 2018 but was delayed to allow time for public consultation. In May 2018 the Open Rights Group, a UK-based digital rights campaigning organisation, criticized Mindgeek's record on data security and commented: "Allowing pornographic sites to own and operate age verification tools leads to a conflict of interest between the privacy interests of the user, and the data-mining and market interests of the company." In October 2019 the UK government abandoned their existing plans, instead proposing the introduction of an alternative regulatory system for the Internet.

Age verification in Germany 
In Germany, July 2021, cases have been filed by Commission for Youth Media Protection at a Düsseldorf court since 2020 requiring MindGeek's subsidiaries to instate age verification protocols. Four pornographic websites have refused to implement the request: some German news media reported that they were YouPorn, Pornhub and MyDirtyHobby, owned by MindGeek, and xHamster.

Websites blocked in India 
In 2018, the Government of India blocked most MindGeek websites, including paid and free offerings (among other porn websites), after a Uttarakhand High Court court order in order to curb the circulation of pornography among children.

Lawsuits

Antitrusts
Manwin Licensing and Digital Playground filed an antitrust lawsuit in California in November 2011, against ICANN and ICM Registry over the introduction of the .xxx TLD. Amongst their allegations, Manwin claimed that in introducing the new suffix, ICANN and ICM registry had exploited the market by making domain registrations expensive with no price caps in place, and created a need for defensive domain registrations with no provision for companies to block typos of their trademarks. Manwin announced that it would not allow its content to be used on any sites with the suffix, with Fabian Thylmann, who was then managing partner of Manwin saying: "We oppose the .XXX domain and all it stands for. It is my opinion that .XXX domain is an anticompetitive business practice that works a disservice to all companies that do business on the Internet."

In September 2012, ICM filed a counterclaim for $120 million against Manwin Licensing International. Part of the 24-page long claim alleged: "Manwin, Digital Playground,  and their related companies,  affiliates, brands, and certain third party affiliates have conspired to boycott the .XXX TLD and have coerced and/or encouraged the boycott of .XXX websites by third parties."

All of ICM's counterclaims were dismissed in the second half of February 2013. The judge in the case stated: "Harm to ICM only is not sufficient to constitute antitrust injury. It must allege harm to the competitive process."

In May 2013, Manwin agreed to settle the antitrust lawsuit it brought against ICM Registry over the cost of .xxx web domain names. The settlement will result in discounted wholesale prices of $7.85 a year for .xxx names during May 2013, and similar offers in the future. ICM Registry is owned by British former fax-machine mogul Stuart Lawley. The settlement provides that ICM will not pay any money directly to MindGeek.

Patents
In May 2013, ExitExchange Corp. sued Manwin USA Inc. in Texas, alleging that its patent for pop-under advertisements had been infringed by Tube8.com and Pornhub.com.

In July 2013, Manwin was sued by John Mikkelson and Robert Freidson, the operators of Skky Inc., in Minneapolis over the alleged infringement of a patent that describes a method for delivering compressed audio and images on mobile devices.

In October 2014, MindGeek USA Inc. was sued by Preservation Technologies LLC in Delaware for alleged infringement on 19 different sites operated by Mindgeek of 11 patent components on data distribution and communication systems, such as a system for cataloging and retrieving videos and other media associated with keywords. The case was withdrawn in March 2015, after Mindgeek came to a settlement deal with Preservation Technologies LLC.

Hosting non-consensual pornography 
In December 2020, MindGeek was sued in California for hosting non-consensual pornography produced by GirlsDoPorn, which coerced women into appearing in their videos under false pretenses. The forty plaintiffs sought $80million in damages including distress, ostracization, trauma and attempted suicide. The lawsuit claims that MindGeek knew about the company's sex trafficking as early as 2009 and definitely by fall 2016, but continued to partner with GirlsDoPorn until the company became defunct. MindGeek featured GirlsDoPorn as a Content Partner and a member of the Viewshare Program. The lawsuit also alleges that MindGeek failed to remove GirlsDoPorn videos despite requests for removal by victims, as recently as December 2020. Another ten women joined the lawsuit, which was settled in October 2021 under undisclosed terms.

In January 2021, a class action lawsuit making similar claims was launched in Montreal. The Canadian proposed class action sought $600 million for anyone who had pornography photos and videos, some of which may have been taken when they were underage, shared on MindGeek's sites without their consent, since 2007. The lawsuit stated that MindGeek knowingly did not "investigate or question its business partner regarding the mounting evidence of sex trafficking".

Hosting child sexual abuse material of child sex trafficking victims 
In February 2021, a civil class action lawsuit against MindGeek was launched in Alabama and it leveled claims against MindGeek/Pornhub on behalf of child sex trafficking victims. The lawsuit laid out arguments regarding the way child sexual abuse material of the plaintiffs was uploaded to and profited on by Pornhub. The allegations in the lawsuit, brought on behalf of the victims by myriad law firms including the National Center on Sexual Exploitation Law Center, were similar in nature to what journalist Nicholas Kristof uncovered for The New York Times in his December 2020 article entitled "The Children of Pornhub.". In a ruling issued on July 29, 2022, U.S. District Judge Cormac Carney ruled that it was reasonable to conclude that MindGeek's activity in hosting child pornography was knowingly facilitated by Visa. The judge ruled in favor of the plaintiff Serena Fleites, and denied Visa's motion to dismiss the case.

References

Further reading

External links
 

 
Adult entertainment companies
Pornhub Network
Gratis pornography
Companies based in Montreal
Companies established in 2004
Mass media companies of Canada
Online companies of Canada
Website management
2004 establishments in Quebec
Internet censorship in India